Woodville is an unincorporated community in Macon County, in the U.S. state of Missouri.

History
A post office called Woodville was established in 1837, and remained in operation until 1907. Originally called "Old Centerville", the town site was not platted until 1883.

References

Unincorporated communities in Macon County, Missouri
Unincorporated communities in Missouri